Stony Rapids Airport  is located adjacent to Stony Rapids, Saskatchewan, Canada.

On June 25, 2006, the airport was used to evacuate residents from northern Saskatchewan when Stony Rapids and other nearby communities were threatened by forest fires.

Weather information
Automated Weather Observation System (AWOS)
Aviation Weather Cameras (WxCam)

See also 
 List of airports in Saskatchewan
 Stony Rapids Water Aerodrome

References

External links

Certified airports in Saskatchewan